Silverio Pérez Figueroa (born July 18, 1948 in Guaynabo, Puerto Rico) is a Puerto Rican musician, writer, comedian, entrepreneur and broadcasting media host.

Early life
Pérez is the oldest of the eleven children of Silverio Pérez Rosado and Victorina Figueroa Amador. The Pérez are of Sephardi Jewish Anusim origin. While Pérez was a teenager he became involved in various church singing groups and in the Puerto Rican production of Up with People. He later formed a duo, Silverio y Roxana, that specialized in Puerto Rican music, and as a result, was a guest -and later hosted- a typical Puerto Rican music television program, "Borinquen Canta", along with news broadcaster Guillermo José Torres. He later studied Chemical Engineering at the University of Puerto Rico at Mayagüez, but remained active as a part-time singer while completing his studies. He then realized that Engineering, while a lucrative career, did not fulfill his vocation as a singer.

During his period as a student of the University of Puerto Rico at Mayaguez, Perez met and befriended such legendary figures as politician Jose Enrique Arraras, basketball star Fufi Santori and sportscaster Elliott Castro. (in Spanish)

Career
Pérez formally started his career with the singing group Haciendo Punto en Otro Son with four debut concerts at a night club called "La Tea" in San Juan (October 30 – November 2, 1975). This band, whose original members included Irvin García, Jossy Latorre, Nano Cabrera and Tony Croatto, toured all of Puerto Rico and some other countries, recording various albums and 8-tracks. The group faced blacklisting in some Puerto Rican towns due to the political nature of some of its songs, and experienced numerous personnel changes over time (most notably Croatto's, who as a non-native Puerto Rican felt uncomfortable by the situation). Haciendo Punto would "break up" twice during the 1980s, to be reformed in the late 1990s.

After the group went into a hiatus, Pérez went into Puerto Rican television with the Los Rayos Gamma show. In Los Rayos Gamma, he teamed up with Sunshine Logroño, Jacobo Morales and Horacio Olivo to satirize Puerto Rican politics. Later on, he became the show host of the successful program, En Serio Con Silverio.

In 1995, he was credited with coining the term chupacabra, referring to creatures around Puerto Rico with a habit of attacking and drinking the blood of livestock, especially goats.

In 2000, he debuted in the show Anda Pa'l Cará on Tele Once; it aired until 2009.

 hosting several successful Puerto Rican television shows during his career including the most recent Anda Pa'l Cará. 
 performing with the known group of political satire called Los Rayos Gamma (The Gamma Rays)
 performing with the nueva trova group called Haciendo Punto en Otro Son.
 his motivational lectures which are usually called "Humortivación" (Humortivation).
 allegedly coining the term chupacabra to name the mythical creature responsible for various attacks on animals in Puerto Rico, Mexico and the United States

Accident and illness
In 1989, an electric gate caught Pérez's right arm and fractured various arm and hand bones, for which he underwent surgery on at least four occasions. On October 31, 2005, Pérez had a cancerous tumor removed from his prostate. Until then, Pérez had been fairly successful in hiding his illness from the Puerto Rican public.

Works
He wrote, in 1996, a book named Humortivación ("Humortivation", a portmanteau of "Humor" & "motivación"/"motivation"; published in 1998), which promotes motivation through humor. It had two sequels, Más Humortivación: el camino del éxito ("More Humortivation: the Path for Success", 2000) and Humortivación… otra vez ("Humortivation… Again", 2007), plus a follow-up, Domesticando tu dinosario ("Domesticating Your Dinosaur", 2005).

In 2004, he wrote El humor nuestro de cada día: las tres tristes tribus ("Our Humor of Every Day: the Three Sad Tribes"), a critique about Puerto Rican politics. The "three sad tribes" in the title refer to the three local political parties (PPD, PNP, & PIP) that have dominated politics in the island since 1968. It was followed up in 2008 by another political critique, Desde mi grúa: manual del elector aguzao ("From My Crane: Manual of the Intelligent Voter").

In 2009 he released Prefiero ser trovador: décimas con amor y humor as a book + CD bundle, which was later followed in 2011 by Punto decimal: décimas para decir más, also a book + CD bundle.

In 2010 he wrote a motivational book, Abracadabra: buenas palabras ("Abracadabra: Good Words").

He also wrote Paso a paso… por el Camino de Santiago: Crónica de un peregrino ("Step by Step… Through the Road to Santiago: Chronicle of a Peregrine", 2014), a memoir chronicling his experience during his peregrination to the Santiago de Compostela Cathedral in Galicia, Spain.

In 2016 he wrote La vitrina rota o ¿qué carajo pasó aquí? ("The Broken Vitrine, or What the Fuck Happened Here?"), in which he offered his "introspective view into Puerto Rican history from 1898 to the present", with emphasis on why Puerto Rico filed for bankruptcy. During 2017, he also offered conferences in Puerto Rico and in United States about the island's current situation, based on the contents of this book.

In 2017 he wrote a novel, Un espejo en la selva ("A Mirror in the Jungle"), about a Puerto Rican psychologist kidnapped by FARC militants in Colombia. He has written several books. Two of the most recent ones, Un Espejo en la Selva (2017, a novel) and La vitrina rota o ¿qué carajo pasó aquí? (2016), were awarded by International Latino Book Awards as Best Drama and Historical Book, respectively. He is the composer of songs, among them, the danza dedicated to the island of Vieques ("Isla Nena").

In 2018 he wrote his memoir book Sólo CUENTO con el CUENTO que te CUENTO ("I Only COUNT with the TALE I TELL You"), where he told his memories as "parent, professional, artist, and Puerto Rican".

Pérez writes a column for El Nuevo Día called  (Point of View). He gives "Humortivacion" talks in Puerto Rico and the US,  promoting his most recent novel by the same name.

In 2020, Pérez recorded  with his spouse and 8 other musicians.

See also

List of Puerto Ricans
List of Puerto Rican songwriters
List of University of Puerto Rico at Mayagüez people

References

External links
Haciendo Punto en Otro Son

1948 births
American columnists
American commentators
Living people
Political commentators
20th-century Puerto Rican male singers
21st-century Puerto Rican male singers
Puerto Rican comedians
People from Guaynabo, Puerto Rico